was a Japanese light novelist and anime scriptwriter. He was married.

Life and career 
Born in Fukuoka Prefecture, Matsu was well known as the author of the light novel series Mayoi Neko Overrun! (12 volumes published between 2008 and 2012) and Listen to Me, Girls. I Am Your Father! (18 volumes published between 2009 and 2015). Both of them were adapted into anime series. His last novel series, Hatena Illusion, of which four volumes were released, remained unfinished.

Matsu also collaborated as a scriptwriter to the anime series Queen's Blade: The Exiled Virgin and as story concept cooperation for Ixion Saga DT. He was also involved at Comiket, being part of the event's Comic Market Preparatory Committee staff, appearing in various talk events, and also wrote for Comiket's 40th anniversary book.

Matsu died on May 2, 2016 from liver cancer. A memorial service was held on May 8, where special attention was made to acknowledge not only Matsu, but his work as well, including through anime artwork.

Matsu had completed the draft for his last work titled Märchen Mädchen and was published on 2016 with story finalized by StoryWorks.

References

External links 
 
 

1972 births
2016 deaths
Writers from Fukuoka Prefecture
Light novelists
21st-century Japanese writers